Andrew Grieve (24 October 1863 – 12 December 1941) was a New Zealand cricketer. He played three first-class matches for Otago between 1884 and 1888.

Grieve was born at Dunedin in 1863. He worked as a tinsmith.

References

External links
 

1863 births
1941 deaths
New Zealand cricketers
Otago cricketers
Cricketers from Dunedin